Eric Falt (born 22 August 1962) is a French senior official at the United Nations, currently serving as the Director and UNESCO Representative for the UNESCO New Delhi Cluster Office. Prior to his current appointment, he served at senior level appointments at the UN and the UNESCO. He served as the Assistant Director-General for External Relations and Public Information at UNESCO Headquarters in Paris between 2010 and 2018.

Falt was a trustee for the Television Trust for the Environment, London, from 2002 to 2009, and is a fellow of the Royal Society of Arts.

Early life and education
Falt was born on August 22, 1962, in Lyon,  France. In 1991, he obtained a master's degree in American studies, from Purdue University.

Career
Majority of Falt's career has been with the United Nations (UN) and its specialised agencies. Before joining the UN, he served as Press Attache for Consulate General of France in Chicago, from 1989 to 1991, and the Permanent Mission of France to the United Nations from 1989 to 1991.

United Nations and its agencies
In 1991, Falt had his appointment with UN as a Press Attache to the Office of Permanent Representative of France to the United Nations. In 1992, he was appointed as a spokesman for the United Nations Transitional Authority in Cambodia, which oversaw and sponsored the 1993 Cambodian general election. In May 1993, Falt announced the results of the elections. Later on, he had brief stints with the UN on peacekeeping and humanitarian operations in Haiti and Iraq. In 1998, he was appointed the Director of the UN Information Centre in Islamabad, Pakistan, a position that he held until 2002.

Between 2002 and 2007, he simultaneously served as the director of both the Communications for the United Nations Environment Programme and the UN Information Centre in Nairobi, Kenya. He later directed the Outreach Division of the United Nations Department of Public Information in New York, before moving to United Nations Educational, Scientific and Cultural Organization (UNESCO) headquarters in Paris in 2010, as the Assistant Director-General for External Relations and Public Information.

Since May 2018, he is based in New Delhi, India and serves as Director and UNESCO Representative for the UNESCO New Delhi Cluster Office, which covers Bangladesh, Bhutan, India, the Maldives, Nepal and Sri Lanka.

Personal life
Falt is married and has five sons.

References

French officials of the United Nations
French diplomats
UNESCO officials
Living people
1962 births